Riccione is a comune in the Province of Rimini, Emilia-Romagna, northern Italy.  As of 2018, Riccione had an estimated population of 35,003.

History

The oldest archaeological findings in Riccione's area date to the 2nd century BC, although it was most likely settled in advance. At the time of the Roman Republic, it was known as Vicus Popilius and a bridge over the Rio Melo river. After a period of obscurity, in 1260 it was acquired by the Agolanti family, connected to the lords of Rimini, the Malatesta. In the 17th century some watchtowers were built on the seaside against assaults by pirates.

Origins of the tourist fame of Riccione date to the late 19th century, mostly spurred by the construction of residences by rich Bolognese people. In the 1930s there were some 30,000 tourists a year, with some 80 hotels existing. Benito Mussolini had a villa built here in 1934.

After World War II, tourist flow was further increased by its choosing as vacation resort by numerous famous people, such as Pelè, Mina, Ugo Tognazzi, Vittorio De Sica, Romano Mussolini (painter and jazz pianist), Maria Scicolone (sister of Sofia Loren), Pacifico Marchesini (bon-vivant/Italian diplomat and recipient of the Yad Vashem Award) and others.

Tourism
Since the 1930s Riccione gained the status of a main destination of summer tourism on the Adriatic riviera of Romagna, and, together with Rimini, is one of the best known seaside resorts in Northern Italy. Every two years, a festival called the Festival Del Sol takes place.

Tourism in Riccione is significant, including mostly young people attracted by its nightlife. The Adriatic coast in Emilia Romagna is called Riviera Romagnola and it has many night clubs. Riccione also attracts families with children, thanks to its theme parks, hotels organize baby sitting for kids all day in the hotel and on the beach.

The hotels on the Riviera, one next to the other, determine the large number of tourists flowing there in summer. The main streets of Riccione, viale Dante and viale Ceccarini have numerous night spots, bars, and hotels, in the night and they are a place for shopping and eating during the day. The seafront is a long boulevard, shaped by a road and a bicycle lane, that reaches up to the town's end going along the sea.

Cycling is common in the Emilia Romagna area and a number of Riccione's hotels provide specific facilities for cycling tourists, including bike hire, cycle storage and tour guides.

Events 
One of the main event in Riccione beaches is La Notte Rosa, literally the pink night, where the city becomes pink. There are parties on the beaches all the night for an entire week end and there are fireworks displays and free concerts.

International stamp fair, the first week of September; held in the Palazzo del Turismo.

National numismatic exhibition, the first week of September.

Ilaria Alpi TV Journalism Award, the first week of June (replaced in 2015 by the Dig Awards, new award dedicated to investigative video journalism).

Riccione Theater Award, biennial, last week of June.

Riccione TTV - Theater Television Video, biennial, last week of May.

Sport 

From 4 to 15 September 2007, Riccione hosted the World Masters Athletics Championships.

From 29 June to 6 July 2007, Riccione (with Rimini) hosted the CSIT championships.

Riccione has a new swimming pool with  lanes indoors and outdoors. Every year, it hosts international competitions. The city has hosted the FINA World Masters Championships in swimming, diving, water polo, open water and synchronized swimming.

Minor sport events are the beach line festival, tennis beach competitions. On the beach there are surf clubs and kitesurf clubs as well.

In 2022, it will host the International Lifesaving Federation World Life Saving Championships.

The absolute Padel championships have been held in Riccione since 2017.

Transportation
Riccione is linked with the nearby city of Rimini by the Rimini–Riccione trolleybus line. Since 2019 it has also been connected with a trolleybus that runs on a preferential carriageway built next to the railway site called "Metromare" with 15 intermediate stations between the railway stations of Rimini and Riccione.

Is linked to the main cities by train, to Bologna and to Ancona (northbound and southbound, respectively). The Riccione railway station was modernized in 2018 in the northern part, dismantling the third track and updating the platforms of the two tracks, north / south, to high speed. The underpass has also been improved and the rear part completely renovated with an iron and glass structure.

The nearest airport is the Federico Fellini Airport in Miramare di Rimini, which is only a few kilometres from Riccione.

The port is a canal port built at the mouth of the rio Melo. The canal port often has draft problems due to silting. On the two piers there are restaurants and some shops. The canal port has about 500 berths.

Notable people
Carlotta Montanari, actress.
Martina Colombari, Miss Italia 1991, actress.
Mattia Pasini, motorcycle road racer.
Madhu Sapre, Indian Super Model.
Isabella Santacroce, novelist.

References

Further reading

External links

 https://www.comune.riccione.rn.it, Institutional website of the Municipality of Riccione
La Città Invisibile , collection of signs, stories and memories on Riccione during the war age.
 Riccione, Riccione tourism web site.
 Riccione, Riccione house web site.

Seaside resorts in Italy
Cities and towns in Emilia-Romagna